En dag skall gry is a 1944 Swedish drama film directed by Hasse Ekman. The film stars Edvin Adolphson and Elsie Albiin.

Cast 
Edvin Adolphson as major Rolf Dahlman
Elsie Albiin as Eva Lövgren, doctor
Hasse Ekman as Rutger von Brewitz, war voluntary
Sture Lagerwall as Company commander, Captain 
Rune Halvarsson as Nisse Pettersson, war voluntary
Olof Widgren as Petrus, Salvation Army soldier, war voluntary 
Sven Magnusson as Mikaelsson, war voluntary
Margaretha Bergström as Maj, Nursing student
Hugo Björne as Falck, doctor
Hans Strååt as Lieutenant Löwenskiöld 
Carl Barcklind as Baron Magnus Gabriel von Brewitz 
Kotti Chave as a captain in the train compartment
Ragnar Falck as a wounded volunteer
Toivo Pawlo as a wounded Russian soldier
Hilda Borgström as an old Finnish woman

External links 

1944 films
Films directed by Hasse Ekman
1940s Swedish-language films
Swedish drama films
1940s war drama films
Swedish black-and-white films
1944 drama films
1940s Swedish films